Eucyon (Greek:  : good, true;  : dog) is an extinct genus of medium  omnivorous coyote-like canid that first appeared in the Western United States during the late Middle Miocene 10 million years ago. It was the size of a jackal and weighed around 15kg. Its species E. zhoui was one of a number of North American mammals which invaded East Asia around 5–6 million years ago, followed by the genus going extinct 3 million years ago. This genus is proposed to have given rise to genus Canis 6 million years ago.

Taxonomy
Eucyon was named by Tedford and Qiu in 1996. Phyletically it stood between Canis and the South American canines that would follow it. In 2009, Tedford revised its diagnosis and described two of its species, E. skinneri and E. davisi, which was originally named Canis davisi by Merriam in 1911.

Eucyon davisi
The jackal-sized Eucyon existed in North America from 10 million YBP until the Early Pliocene. Wang and Tedford proposed that the genus Canis was the descendant of the coyote-like Eucyon davisi, remains of which first appeared in the Miocene (6 million YBP) in the southwestern U.S. and Mexico. By the Pliocene (5 million YBP), the larger Canis lepophagus appeared in the same region and by the Early Pleistocene (1 million YBP) Canis latrans (the coyote) was in existence. They proposed that the progression from Eucyon davisi to C. lepophagus to the coyote was linear evolution.

Description

Fossil distribution
The fossil remains are found in the Rio Grande, Texas to western Oregon and Washington's Ringold Formation, as well as northern Nebraska, along with Greece, Ethiopia, Mongolia and many other locations across the Old World.

References

Canina (subtribe)
Prehistoric canines
Miocene canids
Miocene mammals of North America
Prehistoric carnivoran genera
Fossil taxa described in 1996
Taxa named by Richard H. Tedford
Ringold Formation Miocene Fauna